Dance Club Songs is a chart published weekly by Billboard magazine in the United States, which ranks the popularity of songs in nightclubs across the country, based on a national survey of club disc jockeys.  In 2020, twelve songs reached number one before the magazine suspended publication of the chart after the issue dated March 28 due to the COVID-19 pandemic causing nightclubs to close.

In the issue of Billboard dated January 4, British singer Dua Lipa climbed four places to number one with "Don't Start Now".  The song spent a second week in the top spot in the next issue, the only track to spend more than a single week at number one in 2020.  In February, Madonna achieved her fiftieth Dance Club Songs number one with "I Don't Search I Find", further increasing her records for both the highest number of chart-toppers on the listing and the greatest number of number ones on any individual Billboard chart.  The singer also became the first artist to top the Club Songs list in five different decades, having first reached the top spot in 1983.

Several artists topped the chart for the first time in 2020, including producer Riton and singer Vula, whose appearances alongside producer Oliver Heldens on the track "Turn Me On" gave both artists a chart-topper with the first song of their respective careers to enter the chart.  The final number one before the Dance Club Songs chart was suspended was "Love Hangover 2020" by Diana Ross, a remix of a song from 1976.  At the time of the track's original release, Billboard published only city-specific club play charts, but rival publication Record World published a national chart and "Love Hangover" topped this listing.  Several days after "Love Hangover 2020" reached the peak position, Billboard announced the decision to suspend the Dance Club Songs listing, stating that it would return at a date to be determined.

Chart history

References

number-one dance singles
United States Dance Club
Impact of the COVID-19 pandemic on the music industry
2020